Paul David Miller (born December 1, 1941) is a retired admiral in the United States Navy. His last duty in the Navy was to serve as Commander-in-Chief, of the U.S. Atlantic Command.

Prior to the last position, he served as the NATO Supreme Allied Commander-Atlantic.  In addition he also served Commander for the U.S. Atlantic Fleet, Commander for the U.S. Seventh Fleet, and Deputy Chief of Naval Operations.

Education
 Bachelor's degree from Florida State University.
 Master's degree in Business Administration from the University of Georgia in 1964.
 Attended Naval War College.
 Attended the Harvard Business School Executive Management Program.

Awards and decorations

References

External links
Official Profile
Miller speaks at UGA 
Background Info
Business Information

United States Navy admirals
Florida State University alumni
University of Georgia alumni
Harvard Business School alumni
Living people
1941 births
People from Roanoke, Virginia